Peter Lorrimer Whitehead (8 January 1937, Liverpool – 10 June 2019, London) was an English writer and filmmaker who documented the counterculture in London and New York in the late 1960s.

Early life and career
Peter Whitehead was born in Liverpool, England. He was from a working class background and was awarded a scholarship to attend Ashville College, Harrogate. He was top of his class in almost all subjects, and was both captain of the rugby team and the church organist. This led him to receive another scholarship from Peterhouse, Cambridge, to study mathematics, physics and chemistry, but upon arriving there after completing National Service he switched instead to physiology, mineralogy and crystallography. He later studied art and film at the Slade School of Art in London.

After leaving Cambridge Whitehead developed a career as a film maker. He is best known during this period for his work as a director of promotional film clips (precursors to the modern music video), including a version of "Interstellar Overdrive" for Pink Floyd and several clips for The Rolling Stones. In 1966 Whitehead, together with the novelist and historian Andrew Sinclair, founded Lorrimer Publishing, which published the original screenplays of classic films. Sheridan Morley wrote: "Their format is a simple one: the script itself, with detailed descriptions where action takes over from the words, published with a brief introduction and sideline notes where necessary."

In 1969, Whitehead abandoned film making and escaped to the desert in Morocco, at which time his career as a falconer began.

The Falconer
In 1997, Iain Sinclair collaborated with Chris Petit, sculptor Steve Dilworth, digital artist Dave McKean and others to make The Falconer, a 56-minute semi-fictional "documentary" film about Whitehead, set in London and the Outer Hebrides. This film was described by Sinclair in 2003 as "Initially he (Whitehead) loved the film... his determination to tell his story was such that he kept bombarding us with amazing fragments and endless images, because he's one of the few people whose entire life was documented in images". The film also features Stewart Home, Kathy Acker and Howard Marks.

Books
Whitehead's books include Nora (1990), Hartshead Revisited: A Fiction? (1993) and Bronte Gate (1999). His novels include The Risen (1994) and Terrorism Considered as One of the Fine Arts (2007).

In 1997 Whitehead published Baby Doll (Velvet, 1997), drawing on photographs he took in 1972 during production of his feature-length film Daddy (made with artist Niki de Saint Phalle). Many of the photographs are of model/actress/heiress Mia Martin (known for her appearances in the Benny Hill shows and Hammer films such as The Satanic Rites of Dracula). The writer Iain Sinclair later described Daddy as a "nightmarish film... shot in some chateau in France... unspeakable... I couldn't even bring myself to look at the material in the book".

Documentary
Paul Cronin’s two-part documentary In the Beginning Was the Image: Conversations With Peter Whitehead (2006) consists of new and archival interviews with Whitehead plus extracts from his work.

Personal life and later years
While a student at Cambridge Whitehead met Diane Cottrill and had two daughters, Tamsin and Sian. In 1959 he met Swedish student Britt Svensson and married her in Stockholm in 1960. They moved to London and divorced in 1964. In the 1960s he met the actress Coral Atkins and had a son, Harry.

In 1980, he met Dido Goldsmith, the daughter of Teddy Goldsmith and niece of Sir James Goldsmith.  They were married six weeks after meeting. The couple had four daughters, Robin, Leila, Charlene and Rosetta. Robin Whitehead, a film maker and photographer, died from a heroin overdose on 24 January 2010 at the age of 27. Her family alleged that Robin's involvement with the musician Pete Doherty and his circle of friends contributed to her death.

Whitehead died on 10 June 2019, aged 82.

Filmography
1964 – The Perception of Life
1965 – Wholly Communion
1966 – Charlie Is My Darling
1967 – Tonite Let's All Make Love in London
1967 – Benefit of the Doubt
1969 – The Fall
1973 – Daddy, with Niki de Saint Phalle
1977 – Fire in the Water
1995 – London '66-'67
2009 – Terrorism Considered as One of the Fine Arts

Music videos

1965
"((I'm Not Sayin'))" (Nico)
1966
"Have You Seen Your Mother, Baby, Standing in the Shadow?" – two versions (The Rolling Stones)
"Lady Jane" (The Rolling Stones)	
"Let's Spend the Night Together" (The Rolling Stones)

1967
"We Love You" (The Rolling Stones)	
"Dandelion" (The Rolling Stones)	
"Ruby Tuesday" (The Rolling Stones)	
"Interstellar Overdrive" (Pink Floyd)
"(If You Think You're) Groovy" (P.P. Arnold & The Small Faces)

Bibliography
  (also Simon & Schuster, New York) English translation and description of action by Whitehead
  (also Simon & Schuster, New York) English translation and description of action by Whitehead

References

External links

Official website
Career overview from Film Comment by Henry K Miller
Obituary for Sight & Sound by William Fowler
Music Video Database – Peter Whitehead
 His feature-length film  – made with Niki de Saint Phalle

English film directors
1937 births
2019 deaths
Film people from Liverpool
Alumni of Peterhouse, Cambridge
Goldsmith family
20th-century English writers
21st-century English writers
English male writers